Senozan is a commune in the department of Saône-et-Loire in the region of  Bourgogne-Franche-Comté in France.

Geography
Senozan lies in the terraced hills west of the Saône 10 km north of Mâcon.

The "mountain" on the east rises to 370 meters, and the commune slopes gently down to the Saône. On the south lies the commune of Saint-Martin-Belle-Roche. The Mouge flows from west to east and into the Saône.

The village is limited on the west by the autoroute 6, which runs from Macon north to Chalon-sur-Saône. On the east are the departmental highway 906 (formerly the national highway 6) and the railroad.

References

External links
 Official site

Communes of Saône-et-Loire